The Ghost and the Tout Too is a 2021 film directed by Michael Akinrogunde and is a sequel to 2018 film "The Ghost and the Tout" directed by Charles Uwagbai. The film features Toyin Abraham who plays lead but stars alongside notable veteran actors including Patience Ozokwo, Iyabo Ojo, Mercy Johnson-Okojie, Odunlade Adekola, Ini Edo, Ali Nuhu, Deyemi Okanlawon, Osas Ighodaro.

It was listed as one of the highest grossing Nigerian films in 2021.

Plot 
In the film, Isla (Toyin Abraham) continues to see more ghosts than before and has evolved into a messenger for the dead. She now also has a partner Makawhy (Mercy Johnson-Okojie). Isla is sought for by any ghost who has been unfairly killed or who has a score to settle with the living. She eventually encounters Amoke (Osas Ighodaro), a "semi-ghost"; a woman who is in a coma and caught between the worlds of the living and the dead. Finding the person who poisoned her and attempting to awaken her from her unconscious state is isla's main mission, because Amoke only has a few days to live.

Production 
The film is a collaboration between Toyin Abraham films production and FilmOne entertainment. The screenplay was written by Abosi Ogba, Akay Mason, Uyoyou Adia and Yusuf Carew who wrote a first draft within two months. The film premiered in cinemas on September 5, 2021 and on Netflix on July 15, 2022.

Cast 
 Toyin Abraham 
 Patience Ozokwo
 Iyabo Ojo
 Mercy Johnson-Okojie
 Odunlade Adekola
 Ini Edo
 Ali Nuhu 
 Deyemi Okanlawon
 Osas Ighodaro 
 Anita Asuoha (Real Warri Pikin)
 9ice

References 

2021 films
Nigerian comedy films
English-language Nigerian films
Nigerian sequel films
2021 comedy films